There have been several television shows named SportsNight or Sports Night:

 SportsNight with James Bracey, an Australian television sports news and commentary program
 Sportsnight, a British television sports program
 Sports Night, an American television comedy-drama series